Scorch is a fictional character appearing in American comic books published by DC Comics.

Publication history
Scorch first appeared in Superman (vol. 2) #160 and was created by Jeph Loeb and Ed McGuinness.

Fictional character biography
Originally a normal human from Pisboe, Virginia, Aubrey Sparks was transformed into Scorch during the short "Emperor Joker" storyline. Joker uses power stolen from Mister Mxyzptlk to create an alternate universe in which Superman is a villain and creates his own warped version of the Justice League which includes a psychopathic Scorch, a demonic doppelgänger of the Earth-Angel Supergirl. She attempts to help Bizarro capture Superman. After Joker is defeated, Mister Mxyzptlk decides to keep several of the new characters by adding them to the restored reality. Thus, Scorch continues to exist after the conclusion of the "Emperor Joker" story arc.

Scorch is later seen doing battle with Superman and the Martian Manhunter.

Scorch was also later seen in "The Gift" as a generic villain with no observable goals. She sets a park on fire and fights Superman.

Scorch later enlisted the aid of Martian Manhunter in trying to make sense of her confused memories (later explained as a side effect of the Joker's tampering). Scorch offered to help Martian Manhunter learn to overcome his weakness to fire, and ultimately fell in love with him. In the process, she inadvertently released the personality of "Fernus" that had been hidden inside Martian Manhunter for his entire life. Later it is revealed that several millennia ago, the Oans had transformed the Martians from the "Burning Martian" form into the current one. That was done to stop them from incinerating entire worlds as part of their reproductive cycle, but J'onn breaking the psychological block that made him vulnerable to fire also broke the block on his genetic memories of the Burning. Now free, Fernus attempted to have Scorch destroy an unnamed village for this purpose but her reluctance saw him changing his plans to setting the earth ablaze with the aid of the entire world's nuclear arsenals. After that plan was foiled by the JLA, he then set a city afire to provide him with the energy needed to reproduce. While the JLA engaged him, Scorch attempted to draw all of the flames from the city into herself. Fernus defeats the JLA and attacks Scorch sending her into a coma, and releasing the flames she had absorbed back into the city. Fernus was ultimately defeated, but despite medical treatment, Scorch was not expected to recover from her coma.

During the "Infinite Crisis" storyline, Scorch reappeared as a member of Alexander Luthor Jr.'s Secret Society of Super Villains. A brushfire had erupted in the western United States, threatening homes. Reporter Jimmy Olsen was on assignment to cover the story when a villain named Effigy emerges from the blaze and causes Olsen's plane to crash. Superman arrives, but is ambushed by Effigy and Scorch, who appears to explain why she had started the fire. She had been roused from her coma (apparently by Despero) and was led to believe that the JLA was a great threat. As her accomplices (Effigy, Plasmus, and Heat Wave) engaged Superman, Scorch realized she had made an error and helped Superman defeat them. Superman rescued Olsen, and left the villains to Scorch.

In the recent Martian Manhunter mini-series, Scorch was mentioned, as the Martian survivors sought her for help. The way Scorch was mentioned in the story indicates that her origin was not changed significantly by Infinite Crisis. Also, Scorch has been kept under a sort of house arrest by the DEO.

Scorch is one of several people who later fall under the control of Starro. She briefly fought Miss Martian.

Powers and abilities
 Pyrokinesis — Scorch can create heat intense enough to melt various metals. She can easily manipulate flames, even those not of her creation. She has also been seen using this ability to smother flames by absorbing them into her body.
 Heat resistance — The only time Scorch has been shown injured by heat was when she attempted to absorb the flames caused by a nuclear explosion. Presumably this indicates her body can withstand temperatures well above 3,000 °F.
 Teleportation — Scorch can disappear in a cloud of smoke or burst of flame and reappear elsewhere.
 Scorch can also take on a human appearance. Although she was stated to have this ability by J'onn J'onzz, she has not been shown using it (J'onn mentions that she cannot maintain this form for long).

In other media
Scorch appears in DC Super Hero Girls. She is seen as one of the background students of Super Hero High.

References

Characters created by Jeph Loeb
Comics characters introduced in 2000
DC Comics female superheroes
DC Comics female supervillains
DC Comics characters who are shapeshifters
DC Comics characters who can teleport
DC Comics metahumans
Fictional characters from Virginia
Fictional characters with fire or heat abilities